The 1900 Furman Baptists football team represented Furman University as an independent during the 1900 college football season. Led by Frank Spencer in his first an only season as head coach, Furman compiled a record of 0–2–1.

Schedule

References

Furman
Furman Paladins football seasons
College football winless seasons
Furman Baptists football